Cyclodomus is a genus of fungi within the order Phyllachorales. It is also in the family Phyllachoraceae.

References

External links

Sordariomycetes genera
Phyllachorales